Anagale is an extinct genus of mammal from the early Oligocene of Mongolia. Its closest living relatives are the rodents and lagomorphs.

Anagale was 30 cm (1 ft) long and resembled a rabbit, but with a longer tail. Also, the build of its hind legs indicates that it walked, and did not hop. Judging from its shovel-shaped claws, Anagale burrowed for food, such as subterranean beetles and worms. Anagale fossils have strongly worn teeth from eating soil, further indicating it ate subterranean invertebrates.

References

Prehistoric placental genera
Oligocene mammals of Asia
Fossil taxa described in 1931